Gheriah may refer to:

 Girye (village)
 Vijaydurg (city)
 Vijaydurg fort